Sheldon H. Danziger (born September 30, 1948) is an American economist, focusing in trends in poverty and inequality, and the effects of economic and demographic changes and government social programs on disadvantaged groups, currently the Henry J. Meyer Distinguished University Professor Emeritus of Public Policy at University of Michigan and an Elected Fellow of the American Academy of Political and Social Science and American Academy of Arts and Sciences. He is also the President of Russell Sage Foundation.

He was the recipient of a Guggenheim Fellowship in 2008.

Background 
Danziger received his B.A. from Columbia University and his Ph.D. in economics from the Massachusetts Institute of Technology. He was on faculty at the University of Wisconsin-Madison as the Director of the Institute for Research on Poverty from 1983-1988 before joining the faculty at the University of Michigan in 1998.

Writing 
American Unequal (co-author, 1995)

Detroit Divided (co-author, 2000)

Personal life and family 
Danziger is married to Sandra K. Danziger, the Edith A Lewis Collegiate Professor of Social Work at the Gerald R. Ford School of Public Policy. His son, Jacob Danziger, is married to Phoebe Connell, daughter of longtime Metropolitan Opera chief stage manager Thomas H. Connell III.

References

External links

1948 births
Living people
University of Michigan faculty
Gerald R. Ford School of Public Policy faculty
American political scientists
MIT School of Humanities, Arts, and Social Sciences alumni
Columbia College (New York) alumni